Jak Lingko (formerly OK OTrip) is a public transport integration program designed to integrate payment and physical connection between transport modes in Jakarta. The integration includes TransJakarta, KRL Commuterline, MRT, LRT, Railink and local angkot (Mikrotrans).

History 
One Karcis One Trip (OK OTrip, English: One Ticket One Trip) was initially launched in 2017. The card caps fares at IDR 5,000 for up to 3 hours on transfers for smaller participating local bus services to or from the TransJakarta BRT network, and aims to reduce transportation costs by 30 percent. In 2018, the program was rebranded as Jak Lingko, where "Jak" refers to Jakarta and "Lingko" deriving from the name of the interconnected irrigation network used in the Manggarai Regency on Flores Island, East Nusa Tenggara.

In September 2021, JakLingko officially announced its third generation payment card and a new mobility app, on limited trial since August 2021. JakLingko would implement Mobility-as-a-Service through the app by March 2022. It would later enable account based ticketing with fare classes by August 2022.

Due to media miscommunication, MikroTrans minibuses and bus stops prominently branded as JakLingko, and TransJakarta using prefix "JAK" in angkot route numbers, the term JakLingko is also known to refer exclusively, although erroneously, the service modernisation scheme offered by TransJakarta to angkot operators in Jakarta. The proper brand used by TransJakarta is MikroTrans.

Networking

Jakarta MRT

KRL Commuter Line

Jakarta LRT

Operational 
 Phase 1 - Pegangsaan Dua - Velodrome, along 5.8 km

Planned 
 Phase 2B - Velodrome - Klender
 Phase 3B - Klender - Halim

Northern Line (Planned)

Jakarta BRT

References

See also

 Greater Jakarta Commuter Rail
 Jakarta MRT
 Jabodebek LRT
 Jakarta LRT
 TransJakarta
 Transport in Jakarta

Transport in Jakarta
Contactless smart cards